Phylloxylon is a genus of flowering plants in the Indigofereae tribe of the family Fabaceae. There are seven species, all endemic to Madagascar.

Species
Phylloxylon comprises the following species:
 Phylloxylon arenicola Du Puy, Labat & Schrire
 Phylloxylon decipiens Baill.
 Phylloxylon perrieri Drake
 Phylloxylon phillipsonii Du Puy, Labat & Schrire
 Phylloxylon spinosa Du Puy, Labat & Schrire
 Phylloxylon xiphoclada (Baker) Du Puy, Labat & Schrire
 Phylloxylon xylophylloides (Baker) Du Puy, Labat & Schrire

Species names with uncertain taxonomic status
The status of the following species is unresolved:
  Phylloxylon ensifolius Baill. ex Drake

See also

References

Indigofereae
Endemic flora of Madagascar
Taxonomy articles created by Polbot
Taxa named by Henri Ernest Baillon
Fabaceae genera